Club Deportivo Mensajero is a Spanish football team based in Santa Cruz de la Palma, in the autonomous community of Canary Islands. Founded on 6 January 1922, it plays in Segunda División RFEF – Group 4, holding home games at Nuevo Estadio Silvestre Carrillo, with a capacity of 6,000 spectators.

History
Mensajero's history can be traced to 1922 when a group of friends in Santa Cruz de la Palma formed a youth team. It was not until 1939 that a senior club was established but, with a formation date in 1922, after an excision of players from Tenisca. The first president was Silvestre Carrillo, with two team stadia eventually being dedicated to him.

The club spent roughly 70 years playing at regional level, with various degrees of success. It won the fourth division title for the Canary Islands in 1985, arriving at the national stage seven years later, after winning promotion to the third level.

During the following ten seasons, Mensajero appeared twice in the playoffs: in the 1994–95 campaign, after 22 wins in the regular season, the promotion group consisted of Córdoba CF, CD Castellón and Sestao Sport Club; after a 6–1 home win against the second team, it entered the last round with chances of being promoted, but lost 1–3 at the Andalusians.

In 1999–2000, Mensajero finished fourth after winning 19 out of 38 in the first stage, the highlights being home wins against Caudal Deportivo (7–0, home) and  Sporting de Gijón B (5–1, away). In the playoffs, it could only collect one point in six matches, against Burgos CF, Granada CF and Real Murcia.

The expense of running a relatively small club at a national level began to take its toll and with dramatic cuts in funding, Mensajero was relegated at the end of the 2001–02 season, 11 points behind the penultimate team, CD Onda, and 18 points from the safety zone. Two years later, they dropped down to the regional leagues, vacated Silvestre Carrillo grounds and set up home at the Municipal Estadio Bajamar, sharing it with neighbouring SD Tenisca.

After its grounds' improvements were finished, Mensajero returned home for the end of the 2006–07 season, before gaining promotion back to level four in June 2008 and later back to level three in June 2015. In the 2015-16 season the club managed to retain its place in Tercera División, finished 13th, 4 points away from relegation zone.

Season to season

12 seasons in Segunda División B
1 season in Segunda División RFEF
25 seasons in Tercera División

Current squad

Stadium

Mensajero play at Nuevo Estadio Silvestre Carrillo. Lying at the head of a valley close to the centre of Santa Cruz de la Palma, the stadium was extensively rebuilt from 2003 to 2007. Due to the steep valley-side to the south side of the pitch and the sheer drop to the north, the majority of the seating has always been found at either end of the stadium. Prior to the redevelopment in 2003, there was a covered stand at the east end of the ground. A narrow strip of terracing ran along the north side of the pitch, which joined the terrace behind the west end goal.

Following redevelopment, the basic orientation of the stadium remained unchanged. There is however, a more substantial area of seating behind the east goal and this now arcs around to the north side. The east end no longer features a roof, something, which the original redevelopment plan included, but due to the financial difficulties that the club experienced, the project was scaled down. The north terrace tapers away to a single line of seating as you head to the west. The West terrace remains relatively unaltered from the original stadium. The players changing facilities are found in a single storey building on the south side of the pitch.

Local derbies
Mensajero's historic rival is SD Tenisca. Since the reorganisation of Tercera División in 1977, the clubs have met in the league on 28 occasions, with six wins for each side and 16 draws.

In 1983, both teams played a league match that was considered to be one of the most violent in the history of Spanish football.

References

External links
Official website 
Futbolme team profile 
Estadios de España 

Football clubs in the Canary Islands
Sport in La Palma
Association football clubs established in 1922
1922 establishments in Spain